In Greek mythology, Acamas or Akamas (Ancient Greek: , folk etymology: 'unwearying'), was the son of Trojan elder Antenor and Theano, was a participant in the Trojan War, and fought on the side of the Trojans.

Family 
Acamas was the brother of Crino, Agenor, Antheus, Archelochus, Coön, Demoleon, Eurymachus, Glaucus, Helicaon, Iphidamas, Laodamas, Laodocus, Medon, Polybus,  and Thersilochus.

Mythology

Trojan War 
With his brother Archelochus and his cousin Aeneas, Acamas was lieutenant of the Dardanian contingent to assist King Priam.  Along with Aeneas and Archelochus he led one of the five divisions attacking the Argive wall in the battle for the ships. Homer's Iliad, Book 2, describes the troops of the Dardanians and its leaders:

"The Dardanians were led by brave Aeneas, whom Aphrodite bore to Anchises, when she, goddess though she was, had lain with him upon the mountain slopes of Ida. He was not alone, for with him were the two sons of Antenor, Arkhilokhos and Akamas, both skilled in all the arts of war."

While in Book 14, Acamas avenged the death of his brother, who had been killed by Ajax, by slaying Promachus the Boeotian.

 "But he knew well who it was, and the Trojans were greatly vexed with grief [akhos]. Akamas then bestrode his brother's body and wounded Promakhos the Boeotian with his spear, for he was trying to drag his brother's body away. Akamas vaunted loudly over him saying, "Argive archers, braggarts that you are, toil [ponos] and suffering shall not be for us only, but some of you too shall fall here as well as ourselves. See how Promakhos now sleeps, vanquished by my spear; payment for my brother's blood has not long delayed; a man, therefore, may well be thankful if he leaves a kinsman in his house behind him to avenge his fall."

Death 
Two sources tackles the versions of the myth regarding Acamas' death. He was killed possibly by Meriones of Crete,  half-brother of King Idomeneus in book 16 of the Iliad, but the Acamas killed there was not specifically identified as a son of Antenor. Quintus of Smyrna describes him as having been killed by the Greek hero Philoctetes.

Homer's account 

"Meriones gave chase to Akamas on foot and caught him up just as he was about to mount his chariot; he drove a spear through his right shoulder so that he fell headlong from the car, and his eyes were closed in darkness."

Quintus' account 

Now Poeas' son [i.e. Philoctetes] the while slew Deioneus and Acamas, Antenor's warrior son: Yea, a great host of strong men laid he low..'

Notes

References 

 Apollodorus, The Library with an English Translation by Sir James George Frazer, F.B.A., F.R.S. in 2 Volumes, Cambridge, MA, Harvard University Press; London, William Heinemann Ltd. 1921. ISBN 0-674-99135-4. Online version at the Perseus Digital Library. Greek text available from the same website.
 Dictys Cretensis, from The Trojan War. The Chronicles of Dictys of Crete and Dares the Phrygian translated by Richard McIlwaine Frazer, Jr. (1931-). Indiana University Press. 1966. Online version at the Topos Text Project.
 Graves, Robert, The Greek Myths, Harmondsworth, London, England, Penguin Books, 1960. 
Graves, Robert, The Greek Myths: The Complete and Definitive Edition. Penguin Books Limited. 2017. 
Homer, The Iliad with an English Translation by A.T. Murray, Ph.D. in two volumes. Cambridge, MA., Harvard University Press; London, William Heinemann, Ltd. 1924. . Online version at the Perseus Digital Library.
 Homer, Homeri Opera in five volumes. Oxford, Oxford University Press. 1920. . Greek text available at the Perseus Digital Library.
 Pausanias, Description of Greece with an English Translation by W.H.S. Jones, Litt.D., and H.A. Ormerod, M.A., in 4 Volumes. Cambridge, MA, Harvard University Press; London, William Heinemann Ltd. 1918. . Online version at the Perseus Digital Library
 Pausanias, Graeciae Descriptio. 3 vols. Leipzig, Teubner. 1903.  Greek text available at the Perseus Digital Library.
 Publius Vergilius Maro, Aeneid. Theodore C. Williams. trans. Boston. Houghton Mifflin Co. 1910. Online version at the Perseus Digital Library.
 Publius Vergilius Maro, Bucolics, Aeneid, and Georgics. J. B. Greenough. Boston. Ginn & Co. 1900. Latin text available at the Perseus Digital Library.
 Quintus Smyrnaeus, The Fall of Troy translated by Way. A. S. Loeb Classical Library Volume 19. London: William Heinemann, 1913. Online version at theio.com
 Tzetzes, John, Allegories of the Iliad translated by Goldwyn, Adam J. and Kokkini, Dimitra. Dumbarton Oaks Medieval Library, Harvard University Press, 2015.

Trojans
People of the Trojan War
cs:Akamás#Akamás - Trójan
ja:アカマース#アンテーノールの子